Indole-2-monooxygenase (BX2 (gene), CYP71C4 (gene)) is an enzyme with systematic name indole,NAD(P)H:oxygen oxidoreductase (2-hydroxylating). This enzyme catalyses the following chemical reaction

 indole + NAD(P)H + H+ + O2  indolin-2-one + NAD(P)+ + H2O

Indole-2-monooxygenase is involved in the biosynthesis of protective and allelopathic benzoxazinoids in some plants.

References

External links 
 

EC 1.14.13